Vilém Mandlík (born April 7, 1936) is a Czech former runner. At the  1956 Summer Olympics in Melbourne, he was a semifinalist in the 200 metres and ran for the 4×400m relay. He also ran in the 1960 Olympic Games in Rome. He is the father of tennis player Hana Mandlíková.

References

External links
 Page at sports-reference

Living people
1936 births
Olympic athletes of Czechoslovakia
Athletes from Prague
Athletes (track and field) at the 1956 Summer Olympics
Athletes (track and field) at the 1960 Summer Olympics
Czechoslovak male sprinters
Czech male sprinters